Dan Stoenescu (born 4 November 1980) is a Romanian career diplomat, political scientist and journalist. He was a minister in the technocratic government of Prime Minister Dacian Cioloș.  He is a specialist in international relations, the Arab World and migration. He is interested in the protection of the rights of the Romanian diaspora and in the preservation of the language and culture of ethnic Romanians abroad. From March 2017  to May 22, 2021, he was Romania's ambassador to Tunisia. 
On April 16, 2021, European Union foreign policy chief Josep Borrell announced his appointment as EU chargé d’affaires to Syria, effective September.

Stoenescu is fluent in Spanish, French, Italian, English, Portuguese, Romanian, and has notions of Arabic.

Education
He received a bachelor of arts degree in international studies from Austin College, in Sherman, Texas, in 2003, a master of arts degree in globalization and development from Warwick University in Great Britain in 2005, a graduate diploma in forced migration and refugee studies from the American University in Cairo in 2006, and a PhD in political science from the University of Bucharest in 2009, where he wrote his dissertation on modern Arab nationalism and Islamic identity after 1987. He followed specializations at the European Security and Defence College in Brussels, Netherlands Institute of International Relations Clingendael  in the Hague, Matías Romero Institute in Mexico City and Saifi Institute for Arabic Language in Beirut.

Career
Stoenescu was Minister-delegate for Romanians abroad from 17 November 2015 to 7 July 2016, in the government of technocrats, led by Prime Minister Dacian Ciolos. Previously, he had diplomatic postings in Madrid and Beirut and was president of EUNIC (European Union National Institutes for Culture) in Lebanon for two consecutive mandates   as a representative of the Romanian Cultural Institute. 
Between 2009–10 he worked in the Department on Policies for the Relationship with Romanians Abroad.

Starting in September 2015 he was responsible for the Romanian schools in Spain as First Secretary at the Romanian Embassy in Spain.

He previously lived in Egypt when he worked for the United Nations High Commissioner for Refugees (UNHCR) and the International Organization for Migration (IOM) offices in Cairo. Dan Stoenescu also worked as a journalist for various newspapers and magazines in Romania, United States, UK, Egypt, Lebanon, and the Republic of Moldova. He was involved in Egypt with non-governmental organizations such as African Hope, in the United States he volunteered for the Center for the Survivors of Torture as well as in Central America for El Salvador's Siglo XXIII.

Between 2005 and 2009 he was a lecturer in the political science department at the University of Bucharest, and thereafter at the Romanian Diplomatic Institute.

In 2000, he established the Worldwide Romanians Youth League (Liga Tinerilor Români de Pretutindeni)   and later on the Center for Democratic Education Romania.

Honors and awards
In 2017, Rotary International District 2241 Romania-Republic of Moldova awarded him the highest Rotary award, the Paul Harris Fellow Award, for his support to Romanians abroad and to the international projects of the Rotary Foundation. He also received in 2019 an award from the Macedo-Romanian Cultural Society for supporting the cause of Romanians in the Balkans on the occasion of the 140th anniversary from the founding of this society.

During his academic career, he was awarded many honors and distinctions such as the Rotary Ambassadorial Scholarship, Ford Foundation scholarship, First Phi Theta Kappa All-California Academic Team, Presbyterian Church USA Samuel Roberson award, and distinctions from California governor Gray Davis, assembly member Wilma Chan, and senator Don Perata.

Ministerial term (2015–2016)
The mandate of the minister delegate brought many changes and innovations in terms of political and diplomatic measures and demarches in the relation of the Romanian government with the Romanian communities abroad. Amongst the first measures taken in the beginning of the mandate were transparency initiatives such as publication of the financed projects and the establishment of an online platform for projects.

At the beginning of his term, Stoenescu announced a new direction for Romanian institutions in offering new business and investment opportunities using European funds for Romanians of the diaspora who wish to return home. Therefore, the Ministry of European Funds and the Department Policies for the Relation with Romanians Abroad launched, in October 2016, a 30 million euro program called "Diaspora Start-up", as part of the Human Capital Operational Program (POCU) 2014–2020. The program offered a financing line for diaspora Romanians who returned recently and intend to open a business in an urban area in Romania. It is a program exclusively for developing entrepreneurship and establishing new businesses.
Another innovative measure was the launching of the AgroDiaspora program meant to inform Romanians living abroad about the investment opportunities in the Romanian agriculture available through accessing European funds. In order to develop entrepreneurial skills within the Diaspora, a new online program called "Worldwide Romanian Entrepreneurs" was launched offering hundreds of free scholarships.
To consolidate the cultural links between Romania and its kin ethnic groups in the near abroad, a series of demarches were started in order to establish Romanian Information Centers in Bălți (Republic of Moldova), Izmail (Ukraine) and Solotvyno (Ukraine). The Romanian Information Centers in Bălți and Izmail, established by minister Stoenescu, were inaugurated in December 2016. The center in Solotvyno (Slatina) was opened in 2018 and the one in Korcea was inaugurated in 2019.

Furthermore, a project called the Common Communication Space Romania – Republic of Moldova was initiated in order to support cooperation and convergence projects between press institutions, civil society and governmental institutions on a bilateral level. As part of this strategic project it was established the Romania – Republic of Moldova Mass media Consultative Council – a consultation forum for the civil society, management representatives of press institutions and journalists from both states to harmonize and integrate media laws and public policies in the area of mass media communication.

During his term, he promoted measures to combat what he views as the artificial division of Romanian communities between Romanians and Moldovans, Romanians and Timok Vlachs and Romanians and Aromanians.

For a stronger common inter-institutional demarche in support of Romanian communities, the minister delegate always brought along during his visits abroad representatives of the Presidential Administration, the Commissions for Romanians Abroad in the Romanian Chamber of Deputies and the Senate of Romania as well as of other ministries. The minister delegate was the first high-ranking official member of the Dacian Cioloș government to visit the Republic of Moldova 
In early March 2016, Stoenescu went on a diplomatic mission to Malaysia as special envoy of President Klaus Iohannis and Prime Minister Dacian Cioloș to appeal to the Malaysian authorities to pardon and commute the death sentence for the Romanian inmate Ionut Gologan.

Prior to the 2016 Parliamentary elections, he launched together with the Electoral Permanent Authority a widespread campaign to inform Romanians living abroad about the legislative changes regarding the new possibility of voting by mail and organizing new voting sections in ones area of residence.

Moreover, he initiated a legislative modification of Law no.321/2006 to ensure greater transparency on non-refundable financing for programs, projects and activities in support of Romanian communities living abroad.

The Romanian media recognized the innovations brought by his mandate: "unlike the politicians that had Stoenescu's portfolio, his work was an enormous leap forward"

As ambassador in Tunis (2017–2021)

Since 1963, bilateral relations are governed by a legal framework comprising more than 50 agreements. Numerous agreements were negotiated and signed during his term, including an executive program in the field of health and medical sciences (2018); a cooperation agreement between the National Anticorruption Directorate (DNA) in Romania and the National Anticorruption Authority (INLUCC) in Tunisia; a cooperation agreement between Diplomatic institutes (2018); a cooperation agreement between UTICA (Tunisian Union of Industry, Trade and Handicrafts) and the Romanian Chamber of Commerce and Industry (2019); a Protocol of cooperation between the Government of Tunisia and the Government of Romania in the field of civil protection (2019); A Memorandum of Understanding was signed between the Independent High Authority for Elections of Tunisia and the Permanent Electoral Authority of Romania (2020).

At the institutional level, he also established a close bilateral cooperation between INLUCC and Romanian institutions such as the National Anticorruption Directorate (DNA), National Integrity Agency (ANI), and Crime Prevention Directorate of the Ministry of Justice.INLUCC. Also, during his term, a strong partnership was established between the National Civil Protection Office of Tunisia and the Department for Emergency Situations of Romania, between the courts of Auditors of the two countries, between national radio stations and there are also many other examples…

In the first half of 2019, under his direction, the activities organized by the Embassy of Romania in Tunis on the sidelines of the Presidency of the Council of the European Union included public and cultural diplomacy events, coordination meetings, political and diplomatic events and a debate on EU-Africa relations.

As a representative of the Romanian Presidency of the EU Council and the Commission for Territorial Cohesion Policy and EU Budget (COTER), he also participated in the 3rd round of EU-Tunisia high-level political dialogue on security and the fight against terrorism.

In 2019, he was part of the European Union Election Observation Mission in Tunisia (EU EOM) During his mandate, he also played an active role in the Group of Francophone Ambassadors in Tunisia (GAF) especially in the perspective of the 2021 Francophonie Summit in Djerba.
During 2017–2021, numerous visits to Tunisia took place not only by Romanian officials but also by political, cultural, sports and academic personalities from Romania.

The Minister of Foreign Affairs, Teodor Meleșcanu, came to Tunis, between 19 and 20 April 2018; concurrently with the inauguration of the new headquarters of the Embassy of Romania.

Also, several delegations from the Romanian institutions and the Romanian Parliament carried out working visits to Tunisia.

In the context of the Libyan civil war, he coordinated, on the Tunisian side, several repatriation operations of Romanian citizens from the war zone.
In order to strengthen decentralized bilateral cooperation, he supported the development of cooperation between municipalities in Romania and Tunisia: Tunis-Timișoara, Tunis-Arad, Djerba Midoun-Bușteni, Petriș-Takrouna, Iași-Ariana.
Despite the difficult economic situation, economic relations have become more dynamic under his mandate. Thus, Romania has become the 13th trading partner and the 11th supplier for Tunisia.

The main products exported are: cereals (32%), oil and oil derivates (25%), cars and electric appliances (13%), iron and steel, wood and wood products, inorganic chemicals boilers, motors and other mechanical appliances.
Also, many other numerous meetings and economic events were organized to promote Romania together with the Chambers of Commerce and Industry of Tunis, Sfax, Sousse, Bizerte, Beja. 
Furthermore, the Embassy of Romania in Tunis and Romanian private companies have prepared the Romanian Stand at SIAMAP – International Exhibition of Agriculture, agricultural machinery and fisheries.
During his mandate, the number of Romanian investments in Tunisia has increased: according to data provided by the Agency for the Promotion of Foreign Investments, there are 9 companies with a capital of 41,581 million dinars and 600 jobs were created. Six of these companies operate in the Textile/ Clothing Sector, one in the Pharmaceutical industry and the others in the building materials sector.

Another concrete example is the presence of Romanian companies on the Tunisian market and the inauguration in 2017 of water drilling works in Oued Retem CI02 site (17 km after Nafta, Tozeur governorate), in the south of Tunisia, a project developed by the Romanian company “Drillstone”. Tunisian investments in Romania also included 25 million Euros, invested in the “ORADEA” project in the car cable sector (Câbleries Chakira).
When the pandemicCOVID-19 began, at the beginning of 2020, he coordinated the repatriation of Romanian citizens.
In addition, and in order to support the Romanian citizens in the pandemic context, the Embassy of Romania in Tunis created a network and made available the contact details of some pharmacists, Romanian doctors and Tunisian doctors who speak Romanian.
Culturally and academically, his mandate was marked by the establishment, for the first time, of new Romanian institutions in Tunisia such as the Center for Culture and Science of Romania in Tunisia (2018) and the Romanian Lectorate in the Bourguiba Institute for Modern Languages (2020).

Again on his initiative, Romanian Language courses for the children of the Romanian community in Tunisia were started at the Consular Section of the Diplomatic Mission.
Furthermore, during his mandate and for the first time, was organized in 2018 “Campus Roumanie”. It was the biggest educational event in the history of Romanian-Tunisian bilateral relations. Representatives of 17 Romanian and 14 Tunisian universities were present at the University Forum. Concrete opportunities for cooperation were explored and more than 30 partnerships were concluded.

In order to support the Romanian citizens in Tunisia and the tens of thousands of Romanian tourists who visit Tunisia each year, the Honorary Consulate of Romania was established in Hammamet (2019) covering the governorates of Nabeul and Sousse.
According to estimates from the Tunisia Ministry of Tourism, more than 25,424 Romanians traveled to Tunisia between January and October 2019.
He also supported the creation of the Association of Tunisian graduates in Romania (2018) and the Tunisian-Romanian Cultural Association (2020).

On 27 October 2020, at his initiative, the Mayor of Tunis, Souad Abderrahim, inaugurated officially the “Queen Marie of Romania Plaza” located in “Cité Jardins” district in front of the Consular Section of the Embassy of Romania in Tunis.

Published academic works
 "Islamic and Arab Perspectives on Machiavelli's Virtù", Studia Politica, vol IX, nr.1, 2009. 
 "The Egyptian Muslim Brotherhood and the Road Towards the Ummah", Studia Politica, vol VIII, nr.3, 2008. 
 "Palestinian Nationalism: From Secularism to Islam", Studia Politica,  vol. VII, no. 2, 2007.
 With Dana Pleşa, International Relations and Globalisation in the Middle East, Semne Publishing House, Bucharest, 2005.
 "The Concept of Civil Society and the Viability of a Global Civil Society ", Sfera Politicii, nr.116-117/2005, pp. 75–79.
 "Focus on Romanians – a monitoring report on discrimination of Romanians abroad in 2004 ", Liga Tinerilor Români de Pretutindeni.

Published articles
 "La Roumanie – 100 ans après la Grande Union de 1918 ", Realités, published on 27/11/2018.
 "La Roumanie et la Francophonie ", Réalites, published on 4/03/2020.
 "La Roumanie mérite d’avoir un siège non permanent au Conseil de sécurité de l’ONU", L’Orient Le Jour, published on 4/04/2019.
 "La présidence roumaine au Conseil de l'UE s'inscrit dans un contexte européen particulier ", Majalla, published on 3/02/2019.
 "Défis et perspectives pour la présidence roumaine du Conseil de l'Union européenne", Espace Manager, published on 25/03/2019.
 "La Roumanie et la Journée de l’Europe −70 ans depuis la Déclaration Schuman du 9 mai 1950", Tuniscope, published on 11/05/2020
 "La présidence roumaine du Conseil de l’Union européenne s’achève avec succès, selon Dan Stoenescu, ambassadeur de Roumanie", Webmanager Center, published on 18/06/2019.
 "La présidence roumaine du Conseil de l’Union européenne", Réalites, published on 06/07/2019.

Interviews
 "Minister – Delegate for Relations with Romanians Abroad, Dan Stoenescu: “Free Movement within the EU should be a principle all member states adhere to" “Embassy News, Greece”, published on 21/03/2016.
 "On de-communization and openness – Interview with Minister Dan Stoenescu by Mykola Siruk ", “The Day, Ukraine”, published on 2/02/2016. 
 "Interviu cu Dan Stoenescu, ministrul Diasporei – Cristian Bucur", “Marca-ro, Canada”, published on 6/01/2016. 
 "Interviu cu Ministrul Diasporei – Dan Stoenescu: Sper ca românii se vor întoarce pentru a investi în România, pentru a aduce valoare veniturilor lor, pentru a sprijini dezvoltarea României", “iTimes, Grecia”, published on 19/03/2016. 
 "Votul prin corespondență – Interviu cu Dan Stoenescu, de Chihaia Dumitru", “Știri din Belgia”, published on 19/06/2016. 
 "Interviu/Stoenescu: Mă îngrijorează numărul redus al celor înscrişi în Registrul Electoral; vreau ca românii să nu mai fie umiliţi ca în trecut", “AGERPRES”, published on 15/06/2016.
 " Interviu cu ministrul delegat pentru românii de pretutindeni: “Vreau să afirm fără echivoc, aromânii sunt ramura sud-dunăreană a poporului român”, de Alina Ioana Vasiliu", “Constanța noastră”, published on 4/01/2016. 
 "Dan Stoenescu: Statul român va sprijini în continuare comunitatea românească din Ucraina – interviu exclusiv", “BucPress, Ucraina”, published on 1/04/2016.
 "Ministrul diasporei Dan Stoenescu: 25 martie – Data propusă pentru Congresul românilor de pretutindeni", “Occidentul românesc”, published on 27/05/2015. 
 "Exclusiv// Dan Stoenescu: „Relaţia cu R. Moldova rămâne o prioritate pentru România”", “Ziarul Național, Republica Moldova”, published on 7/03/2016.
 "Dan Stoenescu: „Parcursul european al Chișinăului este esențial în relația dintre România și Republica Moldova, iar națiunea română este numai una!”", “Evenimentul Zilei, Republica Moldova”, published on 12/01/2016.
 "   Ministrul diasporei, Dan Stoenescu: „Sunt în serviciul românilor și asta este prioritatea mea!”, de Ana Țuțuianu", “Ana Țuțuianu – Ziarul Online Românesc din Grecia, Romedia.gr”, published on 21/03/2016.
 "Ministrul Dan Stoenescu: Românii din străinătate își doresc să mențină o legătură cu țara și această legătură se menține prin păstrarea identității românești, de Petre Crăciun", “Identitate românească, România”, published on 14/04/2016.
 "Dan Stoenescu, ministrul delegat pentru relaţiile cu românii de pretutindeni – EXCLUSIVITAŢI RADIO ROMÂNIA – Politica Românească Dan Stoenescu, ministrul delegat pentru relaţiile cu românii de pretutindeni
"Dacă românii din străinătate se înscriu în Registrul Electoral, vor putea vota prin corespondenţă, sau în cadrul unei noi secţii de votare acolo unde ei solicită să fie înfiinţată această secţie de votare".]",“Politica românească”, published on 21/06/2016.
 "Ministrul pentru Românii de Pretutindeni, Dan Stoenescu: Lansăm o campanie de informare privind votul prin corespondenţă, de Cosmin Ruscior", “Radio France International, Vocile lumii”, published on 26/11/2016.
 "Mesajul ministrului Dan Stoenescu, la comemorarea victimelor Masacrului de la Fântâna Albă, articol de Romeo Crîșmaru", “Jurnal românesc”, published on 1/04/2016.
 "INTERVIU. Ministrul Dan Stoenescu: Un fond de investiții pentru diaspora ar permite întoarcerea românilor acasă, de Petre Badica", “România liberă”, published on 22/12/2015.
 "#CentenarDiplomatic Dan Stoenescu: Tunisia, o vitrină de civilizaţie a lumii arabe în Nordul Africii",  Agerpres, published on 15/04/2018.
 "Interviu acordat de ES dl Ambasador Dan Stoenescu, ambasadorul României în Republica Tunisia", Orient Românesc, published on 04/12/2017.

References

External links 
 Dan Stoenescu, “The impact of globalisation on contemporary sub-state terrorism with particular reference to the Muslim World” in International Relations and Globalisation in the Middle East, Dan Stoenescu and Dana Pleşa, Semne Publishing House, Bucharest, 2005, pp. 32–62, on the American Center for International Policy Studies website.
 Dan Stoenescu, “Ethnic cleansing in the Middle East before the Second World War“ in International Relations and Globalisation in the Middle East, Dan Stoenescu and Dana Pleşa, Semne Publishing House, Bucharest, 2005, pp. 85–98, on the American Center for International Policy Studies website.
 Dan Stoenescu, “Modern Arab Nationalism“ in International Relations and Globalisation in the Middle East, Dan Stoenescu and Dana Pleşa, Semne Publishing House,Bucharest, 2005, pp. 110–122, on the American Center for International Policy Studies website.
 Dan Stoenescu, “Globalising prostitution in the Middle East“ in International Relations and Globalisation in the Middle East, Dan Stoenescu and Dana Pleşa, Semne Publishing House, Bucharest, 2005, pp. 266–283, on the American Center for International Policy Studies website.
 Les centres culturels européens en réseau: Rencontre avec Dan Stoenescu 
 NOW Lebanon: Culture cluster – Five European cultural centers join forces in Lebanon
 Ministry of Foreign Affairs of Denmark: Lebanese civil society and cultural actors take part in the EUNIC Euro-Mediterranean Forum in Jordan 
 Ministry of Foreign Affairs of Romania, Department Policies for the Relations with Romanians Abroad: Mandate balance (November 2015 – July 2016) in the Romanian language

1980 births
Living people
Romanian political scientists
The American University in Cairo alumni
University of Bucharest alumni
Alumni of the University of Warwick
Austin College alumni
People from Constanța
Members of the Romanian Cabinet
Ambassadors of Romania to Tunisia